Alcon is a global pharmaceutical company specializing in eye care products.

Alcon or ALCON may also refer to:

People
Alcón (plural: Alcones), a surname
Alcon (mythology), several figures in Ancient Greek mythology
Alcon (classical history), the name of a number of people from classical myth and history
Alcon Bowman (1862-1938) Australian cricketer
Alcon Copisarow (1920-2017) British civil servant

Places
 Alcones, Marchihue, Cardenal Caro Province, Chile; a village

Companies
Alcon Entertainment, a production company

Biology
Phengaris alcon, a butterfly of the family Lycaenidae
Phengaris alcon arenaria, a subspecies of the above

Computing
Alcon (computer virus), a computer virus
Slap Fight, also known as Alcon, a video arcade game

Other uses
ALCON, a U.S. military standard abbreviation for "all concerned"; see List of U.S. government and military acronyms
ALcons, an abbreviation for "Articulation Loss of Consonants", a measure of intelligibility
 Conservative Alliance (Nicaragua) (ALCON), a political party in Nicaragua

See also
 Alkon (disambiguation)